The 1825 Alabama gubernatorial election was an uncontested election held on August 1, 1825, to elect the governor of Alabama. Jacksonian candidate John Murphy ran unopposed and so won 100% of the vote.

General election

Candidates
John Murphy, member of the Alabama House of Representatives in 1820 and the Alabama Senate in 1822, chosen successor of former governor Israel Pickens.

Results

References

Alabama gubernatorial elections
Alabama
1825 Alabama elections
August 1825 events